The LD&ECR Class B (LNER Class J60) was a class of  steam locomotives of the Lancashire, Derbyshire and East Coast Railway.

Four examples were built in 1897. Three were normally based at Langwith Junction, while the other was at Tuxford. In later years they moved to Wrexham, with one transferring to Gorton as the works shunter.

References

Notes

Sources

B
0-6-0T locomotives
Kitson locomotives
Railway locomotives introduced in 1895
Scrapped locomotives
Standard gauge steam locomotives of Great Britain

Shunting locomotives